Rock Hill High School may refer to:

 Rock Hill High School (Ohio), United States
 Rock Hill High School (South Carolina), United States
 Rock Hill High School (Texas), United States